Muqaddar Ka Sitara is a Pakistani drama series that premiered on ARY Digital . Directed by Saqib Zafar Khan and written by Sadia Akhtar, it is a production of iDream Entertainment. It has Fatima Effendi, Arez Ahmed and Inayat Khan in lead roles.

Cast
Fatima Effendi as Hadia
Arez Ahmed as Faizan
Inayat Khan as Razi
Babar Ali as Safdar
Nadia Hussain as Sheena
Tanya Hussain as Ramsha
Laiba Khan as Fiza
Salma Hassan as Khadija
Rimha Ahmed as Natasha
Pari Hashmi as Farwa
Shazia Qaiser as Shaiza
Khalifa Sajeeruddin as Aleem
Shaista Jabeen as Razi's mother
Farah Nadeem as Ramsha's mother
Zohaib Mirza as Zohaib
Asad Butt as Sherry
Usama Chaudhary
Rameez Siddiqui

Reception
The serial leaded the rating charts from the first episode till last at its time slot.

References

2022 Pakistani television series debuts
2023 Pakistani television series endings
ARY Digital original programming